Dwyfor Meirionnydd may refer to:
Dwyfor Meirionnydd (UK Parliament constituency), the UK Parliamentary constituency
Dwyfor Meirionnydd (Senedd constituency), the Senedd constituency